Panchapandavar is an unreleased Indian Malayalam-language film  directed by A. Nadarajan. This is one of the completed, but unreleased films of Malayalam action hero Jayan

Plot

Panchapandavar is the story of 5 friends ( Jayan,  Raghavan, Poojappura Ravi, Chakyar Rajan, Balaji ) who reaches to Mumbai in search of Job. They are helped by a beautiful nurse. Soon everyone realises that, they are in love with the nurse (Saumini).

Cast

Jayan
Raghavan
Poojappura Ravi
Abu Salim
T. P. Madhavan
Saumini
Balaji
Chakyar Rajan

Trivia

Panchapandavar is still lying in the cans evenafter 40 years. The film's negative is stored in Prasad Colour Lab, Chennai  The film went unreleased due to the legal hassle between Nataraja associates and distributors Saffire films. Many eminent film personalities tried to release the movie, but due to unknown reasons, it is yet to grace the theatre. Jayan fans still believe that their idol's film will see the light one day. The film has a much talked about bike racing filmed at Mumbai and has fast-paced stunts, a quality that made Jayan popular.

References

1980s Malayalam-language films
Unreleased Malayalam-language films
Films scored by M. S. Viswanathan